Trial at Fortitude Bay is a TV film released in 1994 and directed by Victor Sarin. It stars Henry Czerny, Raoul Trujillo, and Lolita Davidovich.

Davidovitch plays Giana Antonelli, an attorney assigned to defend an Inuit youth from charges of sexual assault against a minor. The boy, Paloosie (played by Paul Gordon), asserts that he has not committed a crime, and the village elders believe that he has already made up for it. Czerny plays Daniel Metz, a prosecuting attorney eager to punish Paloosie under Canadian law. The film highlights the conflict between governmental and traditional systems of law, and also Canada's conflicts with the native peoples over self governance.

Cast 

 Lolita Davidovich as Gina Antonelli
 Henry Czerny as Daniel Metz
 Raoul Trujillo as Simon Amituq
 Robert Ito as Methusala
 Marcel Sabourin as Judge Lambert
 Paul Gordon as Pauloosie
 Dave Brown as Corporal Anderchuk
 Tanya Enook as Natsik
 Barbara Gordon as Josephine Kant

Awards
The film received two Gemini Award nominations at the 10th Gemini Awards in 1996, for Best Supporting Actor in a Drama Program or Series (Robert Ito) and Best Writing in a Dramatic Program or Mini-Series (Keith Ross Leckie).

References

External links

1994 films
English-language Canadian films
Canadian drama television films
Films directed by Vic Sarin
1994 drama films
Films about Inuit in Canada
1990s English-language films
1990s Canadian films